Chaotic is an out-of-print Danish collectible card game brought to the United States by Chaotic USA and 4Kids Entertainment, and distributed by TC Digital Games. It was released along with the open beta version of the online game on October 24, 2007. The card game is also featured in the animated series of the same name. As of 2014, the website is currently closed and the cards are no longer in production.

History

The Chaotic Trading Card Game is based on an earlier game called Chaotic: Now or Never! which in turn is based on another game called Grolls & Gorks. Each of these have characters from Dracco Heads, an earlier collectible product. Chaotic USA worked with Martin Rauff and Dracco to create a completely new version, of the earlier trading card game.

Gameplay
Both players begin with an equal number of creatures on the board - the most common configurations are 1, 3, 6, or 10 creatures for each player. The objective of the game is to eliminate all the creatures of the opposing player. There are five types of cards in the game, each with unique abilities. These types are Creature, Attack, Location, Battlegear, and Mugic.

Building a Deck
Each player constructs the deck they want to use before starting the game. A deck may contain a number of Creatures (as above), with 1 Mugic and 1 Battlegear per Creature. Additionally, each player constructs a Location deck of 10 cards and an Attack deck of 20 cards. Each card is limited to 2 copies of it (by name) in a player's deck.

Some cards have other deckbuilding restrictions:
 If a card is "Unique," only one copy of it can be in a player's deck.
 If a card is "Loyal" or states "(This card) cannot enter mixed armies," then it may not be used unless all of the player's Creatures are from the same Tribe.
 Only one "Legendary" card may be in a player's entire deck.
 Each attack card has a build point value from 0-5, with more powerful attacks having higher build point values. The sum of all build point values of cards in a player's attack deck may not exceed 20.

Creature Cards

Creature Cards are cards that players choose to make up their armies. These cards have up to six possible background colors based on the "tribe" with which creature is associated. The tribes are listed as "OverWorld" (Blue), "UnderWorld" (Red), Danian (Brown), Mipedian (Yellow), M'arrillian (black), and creatures unaffiliated with any tribe, called "Tribeless" (White). Certain creatures have abilities that are either active at all times ("Innate"), activated at will, triggered by certain circumstances or events, or activate when specific creatures are on the field ("Brainwashed"). Unlike the actual game, the animated series depicted creatures having to manually carry all of their Battlegear and their Mugic with them.

Battlegear Cards
Each creature in an Army is permitted to be equipped with one Battlegear Card, as opposed to the animated series, where players may equip their creatures with spectral viewers and one additional Battlegear. Battlegear are often depicted as weapons, equipment, or vehicles that the equipped creature can utilize. Each creature can only use their own Battlegear in a battle. When a creature is defeated, both it and the Battlegear card are sent to the discard pile. At the beginning of the game, Battlegear is set underneath a player's Creature Card, face-down. When the creature engages in battle, the Battlegear Card is flipped face-up and revealed, where its effects will activate.

Location cards
Each player builds a 10-card location deck. At the beginning of the game, each player's location Deck is shuffled and placed face down on the table. At the beginning of a player's turn, that player flips over the top card of their location deck. Location cards are used to determine Initiative (who attacks first in battle), either by Tribe, Element, or Discipline. If both creatures in battle are from the same Tribe or have the same score for the Discipline in question, then the attacking player has the initiative. Location cards also have a second ability which will modify the game (usually during combat) in some other way.

Attack cards
Damage is dealt through the use of attack cards. Each player must have a 20-card attack deck, which is shuffled and placed face down. Players draw 2 attack cards at the beginning of the game, and always have at least 2 attack cards in their hand at all times. When it is a player's turn to "strike", they draw a third attack card and select one of the 3 attack cards to play. A player must play an attack card during each of their turns. Damage to creatures is calculated by the following equation.

Total Damage dealt with 1 attack card = Base Damage + Elemental Damage + Attack card Text Box Damage + Creature Card Text Box Damage + Battlegear Damage (If applicable) + Location Damage (If applicable)

The players then alternate striking each other creatures in a battle, starting with the creature that has the initiative. A Creature is defeated when it sustains damage greater than or equal to its current energy.

Mugic cards

Each player selects the same number of Mugic cards as creatures that they are using. Mugic cards are held in the player's hand with the three attack cards. Mugic cards will either be tribe associated (meaning only one tribe can use them), and have the tribe color in the caption boxes, or they can be generic (meaning any tribe can use them). Creatures must have Mugic counters greater than or equal to the required cost on the Mugic card in order to use it. Generic, Overworld, Underworld, Danian, and Mipedian mugic cards cost 3 or less mugic counters. M'arrillian mugic cards can cost up to 10 mugic counters. Sometimes mugic cards are affected by the location, for example, in Wood Pillar, Overworld mugic costs 1 extra mugician.

Armies
Each player lays out their creature cards in a triangular formation at the start of the game. This is called their Army. Officially, Armies can have 1, 3, 6 or 10 creatures in them, though sizes of 15, 21, or even 28 or larger are possible if players have enough cards. The different sizes correspond to different degrees of difficulty: battling with 1 or 3 creatures is considered an "easy to play" match, suitable for new Chaotic players, with 6 and 10 being the "standard" sizes and larger sizes being for more advanced matches. (The animated series once featured a 105-versus-105 size, with each side using 105 creatures; however, this battle was never finished, as both players were undeniably exhausted.) Players place their creatures face-up in the formation of an inverted triangle, with the bases of the two triangles placed against each other. Players also select one Battlegear per creature to equip to them.

On a player's turn, they may move each of their creatures once per turn, but only one space on the playing mat each unless otherwise specified. A battle is initiated when a player moves their creature onto a space containing an opponent's creature on the playing mat. Each player may initiate one battle per turn.

Other rules
A "burst" occurs when a player plays an attack card, mugic card, or a Creature or Battlegear's trigger abilities are activated. This is similar to the "stack" from Magic: The Gathering. Once a burst has started, players alternate adding to the burst with their own abilities or effects. Once both players agree to stop adding to the burst, the effects are resolved starting from the last card effect or ability down to the card that started the burst.

There are very little differences between the official rules and the rules of the OCG. The OCG had a deck composed only of cards with the discipline symbols on them called the "Discipline Deck". The attacking player turns over the top card of the "Discipline Deck" to determine the type of contest between the opposing creatures. The creatures's discipline stats are enhanced or reduced by the battlegear attached, or the location. The players then draw "Power Cards" that have multiples of five printed on the cards. The players take turns to draw power cards which reduce the stat of the selected discipline of the opposing creature. The first player to reduce the selected stat of the opponent's creature to zero is the winner of the battle. These battles continue until one player has defeated all of his or her opponent's creatures. At the end of each battle, if an engaged creature has gained elementals during battle it loses that/those elements.

Card Rarities
The introduction of the ChaoticCoins allows members to get points for the cards that they upload, depending on their rarity.

Common: This is shown with a black Chaotic symbol. Worth 10 ChaoticCoins.
Uncommon: This is shown with a green Chaotic symbol. Worth 20 ChaoticCoins. As of the Alliances Unraveled expansion, uncommon is no longer a rarity.
Rare: This is shown with a gold Chaotic symbol. Worth 40 ChaoticCoins.
Super Rare: This is shown with a silver Chaotic symbol with the word "Super" written under its lower half. Worth 80 ChaoticCoins.
Ultra Rare: This is shown with a silver Chaotic symbol with the word "Ultra" written under its lower half. Worth 160+ ChaoticCoins.

Series Expansions 
There have been a total of 3 expansions to the card game including the original. All of the expansions feature different sub-sets or series.
 Dawn of Perim: The initial expansion of the card game that had cards that were directly tied in with the first season of the show.
 Secrets: The original card series introducing many of the original abilities and trends for cards.
 Zenith of the Hive: This set introduced the new infection statuses which could be utilized by Danians.
 Silent Sands: This set introduced the new Warbeast and Conjuror titles for Mipedians.
 M'arrillian Invasion: This expansion fell in line with the release of the second season of the show and introduced a fifth tribe, the M'arrillians.
 Beyond the Doors: This set introduced the new Minion title for the Overworlders, Underworlders, Mipedians, and Danians and the Chieftain title for M'arrllians.
 Rise of the Oligarch: This set introduced Fluidmorpher and Kha'rall titles for M'arrillians. Unlike the Chieftain M'arrillians, these types of M'arrillians cannot make minions use brainwashed text.
 Turn of the Tide: This set didn't introduced anything new, but it did showcase newer iterations of previous creatures and new creatures without brainwashed text.
 Forged Unity: This set showcased new and redesigned creatures with a focus on abilities for armies consisting of multiple tribes.
 Secrets of the Lost City: This is the last expansion, lies with the 3rd and final season of the show and introduces the Tribeless.
 Alliances Unraveled: This set introduced new Past titles for characters from Perim's past as well as other cards such as locations. It even included characters without any tribe affiliation from the past.
 Fire and Stone: This set included few cards as the show was coming to a close.

Online Game

There was an online version of the game, which is in sync with the material card game. Each physical card has a 12-digit alphanumeric code to upload it to a player's online deck. It allows said player to trade, battle, build creature armies, read the lore of the game and more. However, some promotional cards are not allowed to be uploaded.

Organized play
There are three ways to participate in Chaotic TCG tournaments. The first one is somewhat traditional, as it involves going to the retailer and playing using the physical cards. The second method is going online and participate in the online tournaments. The third is a combination of both, where the certain retailers offer their own online tournaments that can only be played at the retailer's store. When players win in tournaments they receive "tournament points" that allow access to special features in the online game.

When going to a retailer's store to participate in a tournament, there are two types of tournaments that will be organized for the event: Organized Play and Sealed Deck tournaments. Most tournaments follow the traditional Swiss format.

Organized Play Tournaments are when players must bring their own cards to the event, and build their deck with nothing but their own cards. They must build their decks accordingly to the chosen format the event has decided to run (e.g. 6v6 Masters) and then play other players in order to earn a spot into the top players. After a set number of rounds, matches become single elimination, until the top four. After the top 4, a winner will be declared and wins said prizes(*).

Sealed Deck Tournaments are when players must pay an entrance fee in order to get into the tournament, always. After the sign-up, each player is normally given 1 starter deck and 5 booster packs, which then they must build a deck (using only those cards) accordingly to the chosen format the event has decided to run and then play other players in order to earn a spot into the top players. After a set number of rounds, matches become single elimination, until the top four. After the top four are decided, a winner will be declared and wins said prizes. Prizes are given to all players; however, the top players are awarded more prizes.

Product information

Booster packs
Like most trading card games, booster packs are sold to distribute cards. The booster packs of this game contain nine cards per pack, which includes two foil cards. The current MSRP for the booster packs is $2.40. Two covers were originally made, one with Blugon and Khugar on it, and the other with Ibiaan and Siado. The covers for the Zenith of the Hive set are Kelvedran and Illexia, while the covers for Silent Sands feature Melke and Gnarlus. All the Dawn of Perim and M'arrilian Invasion booster packs contained two rare cards in every pack, but as of Alliances Unraveled there are three rare cards in each pack.

Starter decks
Two starter decks were released alongside the initial set, "Dawn of Perim: Overworld" and "Dawn of Perim: Underworld". As their names suggest, the decks contain only one type of creature card. Each starter deck contains: 52 cards (although only 48 cards would actually be used to play the game), with two non-game cards within the 52 cards; a rulebook, and a game mat. Three new decks (one for each tribe) were released with the M'arrilian Invasion set in September 2008. Unlike Dawn of Perim and M'arrillian Invasion, Secrets of the Lost City does not show the tribe of the starter deck on the box.
Each starter deck contains three rare cards and one super rare card, chances being a one out of five that the super will be replaced with an ultra rare card.

Demo Decks
Chaoticgame.com announced that two demo decks, playmats, and a rulebook can be provided free at the Chaotic Website in PDF format to give players a chance to learn and play the game before purchase. The demo cards have no chaotic code- thus cannot be submitted online- and have a "DEMO" watermark over each card's image.

References

External links
 Chaotic USA (Redirects to the official Chaotic YouTube channel)

 
Collectible card games
Digital collectible card games
Chaotic
Card games introduced in 2007